Garmash (or Harmash in Ukrainian, Belarusian), (Cyrillic: Гармаш) is a Ruthenian (Ukrainian and Belarusian) last name derived from the word гармата (Ukr., Bel. harmáta, "gun, cannon"). It was originally the name given to Cossack gunners (artillerymen) as well as gunsmiths (cannon founders) at the Zaporozhian Sich.

A possible alternative origin is the Prussian word Garme (Gorme), “heat, warm”. Cf. Skr. ghṛṇa, Gk. thermos (θερμός), Av. garəma, O.Pers.garmapada, Pers. garme, Phryg. germe, Thrac. germas, Arm. jerm, O.Pruss. goro, Lith. garas, Ltv. gars, Russ. žar, O.Ir. fogeir, Welsh gori, Alb. zjarr, Kashmiri germi, garū'm.

People with the surname

Denys Harmash (born 1990), Ukrainian footballer
Oleksandr Garmash (1890–1940), Ukrainian-Soviet scientist
Sergei Garmash (born 1958), Ukrainian-Russian film and stage actor
Tatiana Garmash-Roffe (born 1959), Russian author

References 

Belarusian-language surnames
Ukrainian-language surnames
Occupational surnames